Rana Goswami (born 12 November 1959) is an Indian Politician of Indian National Congress from Assam. Currently he is the Working President of Assam Pradesh Congress Committee.

Political career

He has been elected twice – in Assam legislative assembly election, 2006 and in 2011 – to the Assam Legislative Assembly from Jorhat constituency.
On 24 July 2021 he was appointed Working President of Assam Pradesh Congress Committee.

References

Living people
People from Jorhat district
Assam MLAs 2006–2011
Assam MLAs 2011–2016
1959 births
Indian National Congress politicians from Assam